Kirati Kaewnongdang (born April 16, 1997) is a Thai professional footballer who plays as a left midfielder for Thai League 2 club Rayong.

References

External links
 at Soccerway

1997 births
Living people
Kirati Kaewnongdang
Association football midfielders
Kirati Kaewnongdang
Kirati Kaewnongdang